Cryptocephalus confluentus is a species of case-bearing leaf beetle in the family Chrysomelidae. It is found in North America.

Subspecies
These two subspecies belong to the species Cryptocephalus confluentus:
 Cryptocephalus confluentus confluentus Say, 1824 i c g
 Cryptocephalus confluentus melanoscelus R. White, 1968 i c g
Data sources: i = ITIS, c = Catalogue of Life, g = GBIF, b = Bugguide.net

References

Further reading

 
 
 

confluentus
Articles created by Qbugbot
Beetles described in 1824